After the Magic is the third studio album and the major label debut by South Korean shoegaze musician Parannoul. It was released on January 28, 2023, through Topshelf Records. The album was preceded by two singles: "Insomnia" on November 9, 2022, and "We Shine at Night" on January 11, 2023.

Parannoul described the album as "not what you expected, but what I always wanted", and stated it was inspired by dreams he had after finishing his previous album, To See the Next Part of the Dream.

Critical reception  

Pitchfork awarded the album an 8.4/10, and the "Best New Music" distinction. For them, Ian Cohen wrote, "It's an album that might make one hour of our lives so powerful that we spend the rest of our days trying to remember it." Fader included "We Shine at Night" in a list of "The 20 Best Rock Songs Right Now".

Track listing

Personnel 
Additional Musicians
 Della Zyr - vocals
  - vocals (8)
 Rei from Vampillia - strings, string arrangement
 Fin Fior - trumpet (4, 5, 9)
 Asian Glow - guitar (7)
 eeajik - guitar

Production
 eeajik - producer, mixing, mastering
 Parannoul - producer, mixing, mastering, album cover
 Sarah Alvarez - album cover

References

External links
 After the Magic on Bandcamp

2023 albums
Parannoul albums
Korean-language albums